Ludvík Vacátko (19 August 1873 – 26 November 1956) was a Czech painter. His work was part of the painting event in the art competition at the 1932 Summer Olympics.

References

1873 births
1956 deaths
20th-century Czech painters
Czech male painters
Olympic competitors in art competitions
Artists from Vienna
20th-century Czech male artists